Nemapogon teberdellus is a moth of the family Tineidae. It is found in the Caucasus and Turkey.

References

Moths described in 1963
Nemapogoninae